Jorge Polo Quinteros (born 27 July 1974 in San Fernando, Buenos Aires Province) is an Argentine retired professional footballer who played as a striker.

He has played for Argentinos Juniors in four different spells, his other clubs include RCD Mallorca in Spain, Talleres de Córdoba, San Lorenzo, Club Deportivo Universidad Católica in Chile, and Chacarita Juniors.

The highlights of his career was being part of the San Lorenzo team that won the Clausura 2001 tournament of the Argentine Primera and the Universidad Católica team that won the Clausura 2005 title in Chile.

The low points of his career include relegation from the Primera with Argentinos Juniors in 1996, and being knocked out of the semi-finals of the Chilean Primera by Unión Española, 9-10 on penalties, after scoring to put his team ahead in the game.

Honours
Argentinos Juniors
Primera B Nacional: 1996–97

San Lorenzo
Primera División Argentina: 2001 Apertura

Universidad Católica
Primera División de Chile: 2005 Clausura

External links
 Argentine Primera statistics

1974 births
Living people
Argentinos Juniors footballers
San Lorenzo de Almagro footballers
Chacarita Juniors footballers
Argentine Primera División players
Chilean Primera División players
Serie B players
La Liga players
Calcio Padova players
RCD Mallorca players
Talleres de Córdoba footballers
Club Deportivo Universidad Católica footballers
Expatriate footballers in Chile
Expatriate footballers in Italy
Expatriate footballers in Spain
Argentine expatriate sportspeople in Italy
Argentine expatriate sportspeople in Spain
Argentine footballers
Argentine people of Spanish descent
Argentine expatriate footballers
Association football forwards
People from San Fernando de la Buena Vista
Sportspeople from Buenos Aires Province